This article is a collection of statewide public opinion polls that have been conducted relating to the February Democratic presidential primaries, 2008.

Polling

Super Tuesday
See: Statewide opinion polling for the Super Tuesday Democratic Party presidential primaries, 2008.

District of Columbia
District of Columbia winner: Barack Obama
Format: Primary see: District of Columbia Democratic primary, 2008
Date: 12 February 2008
Delegates At Stake 15
Delegates Won To be determined

Hawaii
Hawaii winner: Barack Obama
Format: Caucus see: Hawaii Democratic caucuses, 2008
Date: 19 February 2008
Delegates At Stake 20
Delegates Won Barack Obama 20, Clinton 6

Maine
Maine winner: Barack Obama
Format: Caucus see: Maine Democratic caucuses, 2008
Date: 10 February 2008
Delegates At Stake 24
Delegates Won To be determinedSee also

Maryland
Maryland winner: Barack Obama
Format: Primary see: Maryland Democratic primary, 2008
Date: 12 February 2008
Delegates At Stake 70
Delegates Won To be determined

Virginia
Virginia winner Barack Obama
Format: Primary see: Virginia Democratic primary, 2008
Date: February 12, 2008
Delegates At Stake 83
Delegates Won To be determined

Washington
Washington winner: Barack Obama First Tier Precinct Caucuses: February 9, 2008
Delegates At Stake 78
Delegates Won 56

Wisconsin
Wisconsin winner: Barack Obama
Format: Primary see: Wisconsin Democratic primary, 2008
Date: February 19, 2008
Delegates at stake 74
Delegates won To be determinedSee also

References

External links

 2008 Democratic National Convention Website-FAQ gives map with delegation information.
USAElectionPolls.com – Primary polling by state

2008 United States Democratic presidential primaries
Democratic